West Yangon Technological University is a public technology university, located in Hlaingthaya, Yangon, Myanmar.

Background History
West Yangon Technological University was established successfully on 15 December 2005, by the key responsible persons of Ministry of Science and Technology . But now it is under the Ministry of Education. West Yangon Technological University is situated nearly the vicinity from Kampyo village, Hlaingthaya Township in Yangon Region and then its campus areas was 220.32 acres.

In July 2015, it was certified ISO 9001:2008 by Bureau Veritas of France.
On 15 December 2015, passed its 10-year anniversary as a university .

Programs
The following Training Courses conducting in WYTU.
Architecture
Civil Engineering
Mechanical Engineering
Electrical Power Engineering
Electronic and Communication Engineering
Mechatronics Engineering
Information Technology
Chemical Engineering
Mining Engineering
Metallurgy and Materials Science

Degrees offered from WYTU
Bachelor of Technology (B.Tech)
Bachelor of Engineering (B.E)
Bachelor of Architecture(B.Arch)
Master of Engineering
Master of Architecture

See also 
Yangon Technological University
Technological University, Hmawbi
Technological University, Thanlyin
List of Technological Universities in Myanmar

References

External links
 http://www.wytu.edu.mm

Universities and colleges in Yangon
Technological universities in Myanmar
Universities and colleges in Myanmar